Telephono is the debut studio album by the indie rock band Spoon. It was released on April 23, 1996, by Matador, then re-released in a two-disc package with the Soft Effects EP in 2006 by Merge Records.

"Idiot Driver" had previously appeared in an "alternate mix" form on the Peek-A-Boo Records November 1995 compilation album Bicycle Rodeo.

Reception

The album was produced by John Croslin, who had been one of the leaders of Austin's the Reivers, recording in Croslin's garage studio on a budget of $3,000. It drew mainly positive critical attention, and in particular many comparisons to the Pixies.  The album sold only a few thousand copies.

Track listing

Personnel
Britt Daniel - guitar, vocals
Andy Maguire - bass, backing vocals
Jim Eno - drums

Charts

References

1996 debut albums
Spoon (band) albums
Matador Records albums